Events in the year 2021 in Syria.

Incumbents
 President: Bashar al-Assad
 Prime Minister: Hussein Arnous

Events
For events related to the Civil War, see Timeline of the Syrian civil war (2021)

Ongoing — COVID-19 pandemic in Syria

January 
 27 January: Over 67,600 internally displaced persons (IDPs) across 196 sites in Idlib and Aleppo have again been displaced due to heavy rains, which destroyed tents, food and belongings.

April 
 22 April: 256,800 AstraZeneca COVID-19 vaccines arrived in Syria, under the UN backed COVAX initiative to vaccinate frontline health workers. Provided by the Serum Institute of India, the majority of the doses arrived in Damascus, while 53,000 doses were delivered to the northwest.

May 
 26 May – Syria holds the 2021 presidential election, with incumbent President Bashar al-Assad announced as the winner of the race with 95% of total vote. The election, however, was deemed as a sham.

August 
 10 August - Syrian President Bashar al-Assad appointed a new cabinet.

Deaths

 4 February – Boulos Nassif Borkhoche, archbishop (born 1932).

References

 

 
2020s in Syria
Years of the 21st century in Syria
Syria
Syria